Zapolye is the name of several  rural localities in Russia.

Arkhangelsk Oblast
As of 2022, fifteen rural localities in Arkhangelsk Oblast bear this name:
Zapolye, Krechetovsky Selsoviet, Kargopolsky District, Arkhangelsk Oblast, a village in Krechetovsky Selsoviet of Kargopolsky District
Zapolye, Tikhmangsky Selsoviet, Kargopolsky District, Arkhangelsk Oblast, a village in Tikhmangsky Selsoviet of Kargopolsky District
Zapolye, Khavrogorsky Selsoviet, Kholmogorsky District, Arkhangelsk Oblast, a village in Khavrogorsky Selsoviet of Kholmogorsky District
Zapolye, Khavrogorsky Selsoviet, Kholmogorsky District, Arkhangelsk Oblast, a village in Khavrogorsky Selsoviet of Kholmogorsky District
Zapolye, Khavrogorsky Selsoviet, Kholmogorsky District, Arkhangelsk Oblast, a village in Khavrogorsky Selsoviet of Kholmogorsky District
Zapolye, Kopachevsky Selsoviet, Kholmogorsky District, Arkhangelsk Oblast, a village in Kopachevsky Selsoviet of Kholmogorsky District
Zapolye, Matigorsky Selsoviet, Kholmogorsky District, Arkhangelsk Oblast, a village in Matigorsky Selsoviet of Kholmogorsky District
Zapolye, Yemetsky Selsoviet, Kholmogorsky District, Arkhangelsk Oblast, a village in Yemetsky Selsoviet of Kholmogorsky District
Zapolye, Yemetsky Selsoviet, Kholmogorsky District, Arkhangelsk Oblast, a village in Yemetsky Selsoviet of Kholmogorsky District
Zapolye, Yemetsky Selsoviet, Kholmogorsky District, Arkhangelsk Oblast, a village in Yemetsky Selsoviet of Kholmogorsky District
Zapolye, Zachachyevsky Selsoviet, Kholmogorsky District, Arkhangelsk Oblast, a village in Zachachyevsky Selsoviet of Kholmogorsky District
Zapolye, Zachachyevsky Selsoviet, Kholmogorsky District, Arkhangelsk Oblast, a village in Zachachyevsky Selsoviet of Kholmogorsky District
Zapolye, Lyakhovsky Selsoviet, Krasnoborsky District, Arkhangelsk Oblast, a village in Lyakhovsky Selsoviet of Krasnoborsky District
Zapolye, Telegovsky Selsoviet, Krasnoborsky District, Arkhangelsk Oblast, a village in Telegovsky Selsoviet of Krasnoborsky District
Zapolye, Lensky District, Arkhangelsk Oblast, a village in Irtovsky Selsoviet of Lensky District

Bryansk Oblast
As of 2022, two rural localities in Bryansk Oblast bear this name:
Zapolye, Pochepsky District, Bryansk Oblast, a village in Polnikovsky Selsoviet of Pochepsky District
Zapolye, Surazhsky District, Bryansk Oblast, a settlement in Kamensky Selsoviet of Surazhsky District

Kaliningrad Oblast
As of 2022, one rural locality in Kaliningrad Oblast bears this name:
Zapolye, Kaliningrad Oblast, a settlement in Krasnoyarsky Rural Okrug of Ozyorsky District

Kaluga Oblast
As of 2022, one rural locality in Kaluga Oblast bears this name:
Zapolye, Kaluga Oblast, a village in Dzerzhinsky District

Kirov Oblast
As of 2022, one rural locality in Kirov Oblast bears this name:
Zapolye, Kirov Oblast, a village in Spas-Talitsky Rural Okrug of Orichevsky District

Kostroma Oblast
As of 2022, one rural locality in Kostroma Oblast bears this name:
Zapolye, Kostroma Oblast, a village in Sudayskoye Settlement of Chukhlomsky District

Leningrad Oblast
As of 2022, twelve rural localities in Leningrad Oblast bear this name:
Zapolye, Bolshedvorskoye Settlement Municipal Formation, Boksitogorsky District, Leningrad Oblast, a village in Bolshedvorskoye Settlement Municipal Formation of Boksitogorsky District
Zapolye, Borskoye Settlement Municipal Formation, Boksitogorsky District, Leningrad Oblast, a village in Borskoye Settlement Municipal Formation of Boksitogorsky District
Zapolye, Klimovskoye Settlement Municipal Formation, Boksitogorsky District, Leningrad Oblast, a village in Klimovskoye Settlement Municipal Formation of Boksitogorsky District
Zapolye, Gatchinsky District, Leningrad Oblast, a village in Yelizavetinskoye Settlement Municipal Formation of Gatchinsky District
Zapolye, Kingiseppsky District, Leningrad Oblast, a village in Opolyevskoye Settlement Municipal Formation of Kingiseppsky District
Zapolye, Serebryanskoye Settlement Municipal Formation, Luzhsky District, Leningrad Oblast, a village in Serebryanskoye Settlement Municipal Formation of Luzhsky District
Zapolye, Yam-Tesovskoye Settlement Municipal Formation, Luzhsky District, Leningrad Oblast, a village in Yam-Tesovskoye Settlement Municipal Formation of Luzhsky District
Zapolye, Zaklinskoye Settlement Municipal Formation, Luzhsky District, Leningrad Oblast, a village in Zaklinskoye Settlement Municipal Formation of Luzhsky District
Zapolye, Zaklinskoye Settlement Municipal Formation, Luzhsky District, Leningrad Oblast, a village in Zaklinskoye Settlement Municipal Formation of Luzhsky District
Zapolye, Tolmachevskoye Settlement Municipal Formation, Luzhsky District, Leningrad Oblast, a village under the administrative jurisdiction of Tolmachevskoye Settlement Municipal Formation of Luzhsky District
Zapolye, Volosovsky District, Leningrad Oblast, a village in Izvarskoye Settlement Municipal Formation of Volosovsky District
Zapolye, Vyborgsky District, Leningrad Oblast, a logging depot settlement in Polyanskoye Settlement Municipal Formation of Vyborgsky District

Moscow Oblast
As of 2022, one rural locality in Moscow Oblast bears this name:
Zapolye, Moscow Oblast, a village in Poretskoye Rural Settlement of Mozhaysky District

Novgorod Oblast
As of 2022, seven rural localities in Novgorod Oblast bear this name:
Zapolye, Batetskoye Settlement, Batetsky District, Novgorod Oblast, a village in Batetskoye Settlement of Batetsky District
Zapolye, Peredolskoye Settlement, Batetsky District, Novgorod Oblast, a village in Peredolskoye Settlement of Batetsky District
Zapolye, Lyubytinsky District, Novgorod Oblast, a village under the administrative jurisdiction of the urban-type settlement of Nebolchi, Lyubytinsky District
Zapolye, Poddorsky District, Novgorod Oblast, a village in Poddorskoye Settlement of Poddorsky District
Zapolye, Shimsky District, Novgorod Oblast, a village under the administrative jurisdiction of the urban-type settlement of Shimsk, Shimsky District
Zapolye, Gorskoye Settlement, Soletsky District, Novgorod Oblast, a village in Gorskoye Settlement of Soletsky District
Zapolye, Vybitskoye Settlement, Soletsky District, Novgorod Oblast, a village in Vybitskoye Settlement of Soletsky District

Orenburg Oblast
As of 2022, one rural locality in Orenburg Oblast bears this name:
Zapolye, Orenburg Oblast, a settlement in Komsomolsky Selsoviet of Adamovsky District

Perm Krai
As of 2022, ten rural localities in Perm Krai bear this name:
Zapolye, Ilyinsky District, Perm Krai, a village in Ilyinsky District
Zapolye (Verkh-Invenskoye Rural Settlement), Kudymkarsky District, Perm Krai, a village in Kudymkarsky District; municipally, a part of Verkh-Invenskoye Rural Settlement of that district
Zapolye (Beloyevskoye Rural Settlement), Kudymkarsky District, Perm Krai, a village in Kudymkarsky District; municipally, a part of Beloyevskoye Rural Settlement of that district
Zapolye (Postanogovskoye Rural Settlement), Nytvensky District, Perm Krai, a village in Nytvensky District; municipally, a part of Postanogovskoye Rural Settlement of that district
Zapolye (Nytvenskoye Urban Settlement), Nytvensky District, Perm Krai, a village in Nytvensky District; municipally, a part of Nytvenskoye Urban Settlement of that district
Zapolye (Taborskoye Rural Settlement), Okhansky District, Perm Krai, a village in Okhansky District; municipally, a part of Taborskoye Rural Settlement of that district
Zapolye (Kazanskoye Rural Settlement), Okhansky District, Perm Krai, a village in Okhansky District; municipally, a part of Kazanskoye Rural Settlement of that district
Zapolye, Permsky District, Perm Krai, a village in Permsky District
Zapolye (Sepychevskoye Rural Settlement), Vereshchaginsky District, Perm Krai, a village in Vereshchaginsky District; municipally, a part of Sepychevskoye Rural Settlement of that district
Zapolye (Putinskoye Rural Settlement), Vereshchaginsky District, Perm Krai, a village in Vereshchaginsky District; municipally, a part of Putinskoye Rural Settlement of that district

Pskov Oblast
As of 2022, seventeen rural localities in Pskov Oblast bear this name:
Zapolye, Bezhanitsky District, Pskov Oblast, a village in Bezhanitsky District
Zapolye (Vyazyevskaya Rural Settlement), Dedovichsky District, Pskov Oblast, a village in Dedovichsky District; municipally, a part of Vyazyevskaya Rural Settlement of that district
Zapolye (Sosonskaya Rural Settlement), Dedovichsky District, Pskov Oblast, a village in Dedovichsky District; municipally, a part of Sosonskaya Rural Settlement of that district
Zapolye (Gavrovskaya Rural Settlement), Dnovsky District, Pskov Oblast, a village in Dnovsky District; municipally, a part of Gavrovskaya Rural Settlement of that district
Zapolye (Iskrovskaya Rural Settlement), Dnovsky District, Pskov Oblast, a village in Dnovsky District; municipally, a part of Iskrovskaya Rural Settlement of that district
Zapolye (Dobruchinskaya Rural Settlement), Gdovsky District, Pskov Oblast, a village in Gdovsky District; municipally, a part of Dobruchinskaya Rural Settlement of that district
Zapolye (Yushkinskaya Rural Settlement), Gdovsky District, Pskov Oblast, a village in Gdovsky District; municipally, a part of Yushkinskaya Rural Settlement of that district
Zapolye, Loknyansky District, Pskov Oblast, a village in Loknyansky District
Zapolye, Palkinsky District, Pskov Oblast, a village in Palkinsky District
Zapolye (Zapolskaya Rural Settlement), Plyussky District, Pskov Oblast, a village in Plyussky District; municipally, a part of Zapolskaya Rural Settlement of that district
Zapolye (Plyusskaya Rural Settlement), Plyussky District, Pskov Oblast, a village in Plyussky District; municipally, a part of Plyusskaya Rural Settlement of that district
Zapolye (Dubrovenskaya Rural Settlement), Porkhovsky District, Pskov Oblast, a village in Porkhovsky District; municipally, a part of Dubrovenskaya Rural Settlement of that district
Zapolye (Logovinskaya Rural Settlement), Porkhovsky District, Pskov Oblast, a village in Porkhovsky District; municipally, a part of Logovinskaya Rural Settlement of that district
Zapolye (Slavkovskaya Rural Settlement), Porkhovsky District, Pskov Oblast, a village in Porkhovsky District; municipally, a part of Slavkovskaya Rural Settlement of that district
Zapolye (Sikovitskaya Rural Settlement), Strugo-Krasnensky District, Pskov Oblast, a village in Strugo-Krasnensky District; municipally, a part of Sikovitskaya Rural Settlement of that district
Zapolye (Maryinskaya Rural Settlement), Strugo-Krasnensky District, Pskov Oblast, a village in Strugo-Krasnensky District; municipally, a part of Maryinskaya Rural Settlement of that district
Zapolye (Novoselskaya Rural Settlement), Strugo-Krasnensky District, Pskov Oblast, a village in Strugo-Krasnensky District; municipally, a part of Novoselskaya Rural Settlement of that district

Ryazan Oblast
As of 2022, two rural localities in Ryazan Oblast bear this name:
Zapolye, Shilovsky District, Ryazan Oblast, a village in Mosolovsky Rural Okrug of Shilovsky District
Zapolye, Starozhilovsky District, Ryazan Oblast, a selo in Grebnevsky Rural Okrug of Starozhilovsky District

Smolensk Oblast
As of 2022, two rural localities in Smolensk Oblast bear this name:
Zapolye, Kardymovsky District, Smolensk Oblast, a village in Tyushinskoye Rural Settlement of Kardymovsky District
Zapolye, Yelninsky District, Smolensk Oblast, a village in Malyshevskoye Rural Settlement of Yelninsky District

Tver Oblast
As of 2022, four rural localities in Tver Oblast bear this name:
Zapolye, Rameshkovsky District, Tver Oblast, a village in Rameshkovsky District
Zapolye, Torzhoksky District, Tver Oblast, a village in Torzhoksky District
Zapolye, Vyshnevolotsky District, Tver Oblast, a village in Vyshnevolotsky District
Zapolye, Zapadnodvinsky District, Tver Oblast, a village in Zapadnodvinsky District

Vladimir Oblast
As of 2022, one rural locality in Vladimir Oblast bears this name:
Zapolye, Vladimir Oblast, a village in Kovrovsky District

Vologda Oblast
As of 2022, four rural localities in Vologda Oblast bear this name:
Zapolye, Babayevsky District, Vologda Oblast, a village in Siuchsky Selsoviet of Babayevsky District
Zapolye, Chagodoshchensky District, Vologda Oblast, a village in Belokrestsky Selsoviet of Chagodoshchensky District
Zapolye, Chuchkovsky Selsoviet, Sokolsky District, Vologda Oblast, a village in Chuchkovsky Selsoviet of Sokolsky District
Zapolye, Vorobyevsky Selsoviet, Sokolsky District, Vologda Oblast, a village in Vorobyevsky Selsoviet of Sokolsky District